Tündre Nature Reserve is a nature reserve situated in southern Estonia, straddling the border between Viljandi and Valga County.

Tündre Nature Reserve serves to protect an area of swamp forest in which several species of bird, notably osprey, capercaillie and three-toed woodpecker, as well as some species of fungi have their habitat.

References

Nature reserves in Estonia
Wetlands of Estonia
Mulgi Parish